Sincerely Charlotte is a 1985 French drama film directed by Caroline Huppert and starring Isabelle Huppert.

Plot
After her lover has been murdered, a young singer (Isabelle Huppert) is forced to hide out at the home of her ex-boyfriend (Niels Arestrup) who is currently living there with his new love (Christine Pascal).

Cast
 Isabelle Huppert - Charlotte
 Niels Arestrup - Mathieu
 Christine Pascal - Christine
 Roland Blanche - Le représentant
 Nicolas Wostrikoff - Freddy
 Josine Comellas - Jacqueline
 Bérangère Gros - Marie-Cécile
 Eduardo Manet - Emilio
 Tina Sportolaro - Nurse Chinon
 Jean-Michel Ribes - Roger
 Luc Béraud - Intern Chinon
 François Berléand - The officer PTT

See also
 Isabelle Huppert on screen and stage

References

External links

1985 films
1980s French-language films
1985 drama films
Films directed by Caroline Huppert
French drama films
1980s French films